Potter Peak is a peak standing 6 nautical miles (11 km) east of Mount Jenkins in the Sweeney Mountains, Palmer Land. First observed from aircraft by the Ronne Antarctic Research Expedition (RARE), 1947–48. Mapped by United States Geological Survey (USGS) from surveys and U.S. Navy air photos, 1961–67. Named by Advisory Committee on Antarctic Names (US-ACAN) for Christopher J. Potter, glaciologist at Byrd Station, summer 1965–66.

References

Mountains of Palmer Land